Odo IV may refer to:

 Odo, Count of Champagne (ca. 1040 – 1115)
 Odo IV, Duke of Burgundy (1295–1350)